The 1988 Australian Open was a tennis tournament played on outdoor hard courts at Flinders Park in Melbourne in Victoria in Australia. It was the 76th edition of the Australian Open and was held from 11 through 24 January 1988 and was the first edition of the tournament hosted at Flinders Park. It would mark the first time a Grand Slam final would be played indoors under a roof; after the first 3 games of the Women's Final, there was a 1-hour & 23 min delay to close the roof.

This was the first Australian Open to have 128-players in each singles category, in line with the other three majors.

Seniors

Men's singles

 Mats Wilander defeated  Pat Cash 6–3, 6–7(3–7), 3–6, 6–1, 8–6
 It was Wilander's 5th career Grand Slam title and his 3rd and last Australian Open title.

Women's singles

 Steffi Graf defeated  Chris Evert 6–1, 7–6(7–3)
 It was Graf's 2nd career Grand Slam title and her 1st Australian Open title. She became the first German player – male or female – to win an Australian Open singles title.

Men's doubles

 Rick Leach /  Jim Pugh defeated  Jeremy Bates /  Peter Lundgren 6–3, 6–2, 6–3 
 It was Leach's 1st career Grand Slam title and his 1st Australian Open title. It was Pugh's 1st career Grand Slam title and his 1st Australian Open title.

Women's doubles

 Martina Navratilova /  Pam Shriver defeated  Chris Evert /  Wendy Turnbull 6–0, 7–5 
 It was Navratilova's 49th career Grand Slam title and her 10th Australian Open title. It was Shriver's 20th career Grand Slam title and her 7th Australian Open title.

Mixed doubles

 Jana Novotná /  Jim Pugh defeated  Martina Navratilova /  Tim Gullikson 5–7, 6–2, 6–4
 It was Novotná's 1st career Grand Slam title and her 1st Australian Open title. It was Pugh's 2nd career Grand Slam title and his 2nd Australian Open title.

Juniors

Boys' singles

 Johan Anderson defeated  Andrew Florent 7–5, 7–6

Girls' singles

 Jo-Anne Faull defeated  Emmanuelle Derly 6–4, 6–4

Boys' doubles

 Jason Stoltenberg /  Todd Woodbridge defeated  Johan Anderson /  Richard Fromberg 6–3, 6–2

Girls' doubles

 Jo-Anne Faull /  Rachel McQuillan defeated  Kate McDonald /  Rennae Stubbs 6–1, 7–5

External links
 Australian Open official website

 
 

 
1988 in Australian tennis
January 1988 sports events in Australia
1988,Australian Open